Tangled is the fifth solo album by English singer-songwriter Nick Heyward. It was released in 1995 through Epic Records and produced two singles, "The World" (#47 in the UK Singles Chart) and "Rollerblade" (#37 in the UK Singles Chart).

Track listing

Personnel 
Credits are adapted from the album's liner notes.

 Nick Heyward – Arranger, composer, vocals, acoustic guitar, harmonica, keyboards, piano, design
 Andy Bell – Bass guitar
 Ben Blakeman – Guitar
 David Bucknall – Cello
 Anthony Clark – Hammond organ, backing vocals
 Keith Fairburn – Percussion, tambourine
 Amelia Fletcher – Vocals
 Jim Kimberley – Drums
 Geoffrey Richardson – Clarinet, ukulele, viola, violin
 Tony Rivers – Backing vocals
 Donald Ross Skinner – Guitar, electric guitar
 Graham Ward – Drums

Production
 Nick Heyward – Record producer
 Julian Gordon-Hastings – Engineer, mixing
 Ian Shaw – Engineer, mixing
 Jerry Kitchenman – mixing
 John Davis – Mastering
 Ben Wiseman – Mastering
 Ryan Art – Design

References

External links 
 
 

1995 albums
Nick Heyward albums
Epic Records albums